The 2014 United States House of Representatives elections in Missouri were held on Tuesday, November 4, 2014 to elect the eight U.S. representatives from the state of Missouri, one from each of the state's eight congressional districts.

Overview

District
Results of the 2014 United States House of Representatives elections in Missouri by district:

District 1

Missouri's 1st congressional district is held by seven-term incumbent Democrat Lacy Clay. Three Republicans - Martin Baker, Daniel Elder, and David Koehr - filed for the August 5th primary. The winner was Daniel Elder, who faced the incumbent and a Libertarian - Robb Cunningham - in the November election.

The following candidates were certified by the Secretary of State.

Republican primary

Candidates
 Martin Baker
 Daniel Elder
 David Koehr

Results

Democratic primary

Candidates
 William (Lacy) Clay, Jr. won the election to the US Congress in 2000 after his father, Bill Clay, retired after 32 years in the US Congress.

Results

Libertarian primary

Candidates
 Robb Cunningham

Results

General election

Results

District 2

Missouri's 2nd congressional district is held by one-term incumbent Republican Ann Wagner. The incumbent faced Democrat Arthur Lieber and Libertarian Bill Slantz in the November election.

The following candidates have been certified by the Secretary of State.

Republican primary

Candidates
 Ann Wagner

Results

Democratic primary

Candidates
 Arthur Lieber

Results

Libertarian primary

Candidates
 Bill Slantz

Results

General election

Results

District 3

Missouri's 3rd congressional district is held by three-term incumbent Republican Blaine Luetkemeyer. Two other Republicans - Leonard Steinman and John Morris - are competing with the incumbent in the August 5th primary. Two Democrats - Velma Steinman and Courtney Denton - are competing in the Democratic primary. The winners of those primaries faced Libertarian Steven Hendrick in the November election.

The following candidates have been certified by the Secretary of State.

Republican primary

Candidates
 Blaine Luetkemeyer
 John Morris
 Leonard Steinman

Results

Democratic primary

Candidates
 Courtney Denton
 Velma Steinman

Results

Libertarian primary

Candidates
 Steven Hedrick

Results

General election

Results

District 4

Missouri's 4th congressional district is held by two-term incumbent Republican Vicky Hartzler. The incumbent faced a challenger - John Webb - in the August 5 primary. Two libertarians - Randy Langkraehr and Herschel Young - faced each other at the same time. The winners of those primaries faced Democrat Nate Irvin in the November election.

The following candidates have been certified by the Secretary of State.

Republican primary

Candidates
 Vicky Hartzler
 John Webb

Results

Democratic primary

Candidates
 Nate Irvin

Results

Libertarian primary

Candidates
 Randy Langkraehr
 Herschel L. Young

Results

General election

Results

District 5

Missouri's 5th congressional district is held by five-term incumbent Democrat Emanuel Cleaver. The incumbent is being challenged by four other candidates in the August 5th primary: Mark Memoly, Bob Gough, Eric Holmes, and Charles Lindsey. Four Republicans are competing with one another in the primary: Bill Lindsey, Berton Knox, Michael Burris, and Jacob Turk (who was the Republican nominee in the past four elections). The winners of those primaries faced Libertarian Roy Welborn in the November election.

The following candidates have been certified by the Secretary of State.

Republican primary

Candidates
 Michael Burris
 Berton A. Knox
 Bill Lindsey
 Jacob Turk

Results

Democratic primary

Candidates
 Emanuel Cleaver
 Bob Gough
 Eric Holmes
 Charles Lindsey
 Mark S. Memoly

Results

Libertarian primary

Candidates
 Roy Welborn

Results

General election

Results

District 6

Missouri's 6th congressional district is held by seven-term incumbent Republican Sam Graves. The incumbent is facing three challengers in the August 5th primary: Kyle Reid, Brian Tharp, and Christopher Ryan. Three Democrats are competing in the primary: Bill Hedge, Edward Fields, and Gary Crose. The winners of those primaries faced Libertarian Russ Monchil in the November election.

The following candidates have been certified by the Secretary of State.

Republican primary

Candidates
 Sam Graves
 Kyle Reid
 Christopher Ryan
 Brian Tharp

Results

Democratic primary

Candidates
 Gary Crose
 Edward Fields
 Bill Hedge

Results

Libertarian primary

Candidates
 Russ Monchil

Results

General election

Results

District 7

Missouri's 7th congressional district is held by two-term incumbent Republican Billy Long. Marshall Works is challenging the incumbent in the August 5th primary. Two Democrats are competing in the primary: Genevieve Williams and 2012 candidate Jim Evans. The winners of those primaries faced Libertarian Kevin Craig in the November election.

The following candidates have been certified by the Secretary of State.

Republican primary

Candidates
 Billy Long
 Marshall Works

Results

Democratic primary

Candidates
 Jim Evans
 Genevieve Williams

Results

Libertarian primary

Candidates
 Kevin Craig

Results

General election

Results

District 8

Missouri's 8th congressional district is held by one-term incumbent Republican Jason Smith. The incumbent faced Democrat Barbara Stocker, Libertarian Rick Vandeven, and Constitution Party candidate Doug Enyart in the November election.

The following candidates have been certified by the Secretary of State.

Republican primary

Candidates
 Jason Smith

Results

Democratic primary

Candidates
 Barbara Stocker

Results

Libertarian primary
 Rick Vandeven

Results

Constitution primary

Results

General election

Results

References

External links
U.S. House elections in Missouri, 2014 at Ballotpedia
Campaign contributions at OpenSecrets

2014 Missouri elections
2014
Missouri